Christian J. Mohn (20 April 1926 – 31 December 2018) was a Norwegian ski jumper and sports official. His career highlights included a fourth place at the FIS Nordic World Ski Championships 1950, a second place at the Holmenkollen Ski Festival in 1952, and 20th place at the FIS Nordic World Ski Championships 1954. He represented IL Heming and also practised golf, yacht racing, tennis, bandy, and handball.

Mohn served as president of the Norwegian Ski Federation from 1978–80, and as chairman of the Friends of Ski Jumping. He died at the age of 92.

References

1926 births
2018 deaths
Skiers from Oslo
Norwegian male ski jumpers
Norwegian sports executives and administrators
Place of death missing